Norway participated at the 2018 Summer Youth Olympics in Buenos Aires, Argentina from 6 October to 18 October 2018.

Badminton

Norway qualified one player based on the Badminton Junior World Rankings.

Singles

Team

Beach volleyball

Norway qualified a girls' team based on their performance at 2017-18 European Youth Continental Cup Final.

 Girls' tournament - 1 team of 2 athletes

Diving

Golf

Individual

Team

Gymnastics

Artistic
Norway qualified one gymnast based on its performance at the 2018 European Junior Championship.

 Boys' artistic individual all-around - 1 quota

Boys

Rhythmic
Norway qualified one rhythmic gymnast based on its performance at the European qualification event.

 Girls' rhythmic individual all-around - 1 quota

Girls

Karate

Norway qualified one athlete based on its performance at one of the Karate Qualification Tournaments.

 Girls' +59kg - Annika Sælid

Rowing

Norway qualified one boat based on its performance at the 2017 World Junior Rowing Championships.

 Boys' single sculls - 1 athlete

Sailing

Norway qualified one boat based on its performance at the Techno 293+ European Qualifier.

 Girls' Techno 293+ - 1 boat

Swimming

Boys

Girls

Mixed

Taekwondo

References

2018 in Norwegian sport
Nations at the 2018 Summer Youth Olympics
Norway at the Youth Olympics